The Yangon Zoo (Yangon Zoo) is the oldest and the second largest zoo in Myanmar. Located immediately north of downtown Yangon near Kandawgyi Lake, the  recreational park also includes a museum of natural history, an aquarium and an amusement park. With a collection of nearly 200 species and 1100 animals, the zoo draws nearly 2.2 million visitors annually. The zoo was operated by the Forest Department under the Ministry of Forestry until April 2011, and is now operated by a private firm.

Yangon Zoo is open from 8 AM to 6 PM daily.

History
The first collection of wild animals in Yangon began in 1882 in connection with Phayre's Museum, then situated at the present site of the Yangon General Hospital. Funded by a public donation of 240,000 kyats(approximately US$240,000 then) construction started at the present site near the Royal Lake (Kandawgyi Lake) in 1901. The newly established  zoological gardens was formally opened as the Victoria Memorial Park and Zoological Gardens in honor of Queen Victoria. The major attraction at the opening was the white elephant of King Thibaw, the last king of then Burma, whom the British had exiled to India only 20 years earlier. In 1908 the Victoria Memorial Park and Zoological Gardens Act was passed giving the establishment a legal recognition.

The zoo was vandalized and looted during World War II. The enlarged compound opened doors to new attractions: a museum of natural history on 4 May 1966, an amusement park on 7 October 1997 and an aquarium on 1 October 1998. The aquarium is operated by the Department of Fisheries.

Between 2003 and 2006, the zoo underwent a MMK600M (approximately US$600K) renovation program, resulting in an increase in the number of visitors from 1.1 million in 2003-2004 and 1.8 million in 2004–2005 to 2.2 million in 2005–2006.

A large number of animals at Yangon Zoo, including elephants, monkeys, rhinos, and bears, were relocated to the Naypyidaw Zoo in February 2008.

Attractions

Land animals
The zoo has 145 species of land animals, including 8 endangered species (the tiger, the takin, Asian elephant, the Burmese large tortoise, the great hornbill, the marsh crocodile and the eld's deer). In 2000, the number of land animals in the zoo was 1203 while that in 2006 was 1100.

Flora
In 2000, the zoo had over 300 species of flora totaling over 15,000 pieces.

Museum of Natural History
The Natural History Museum, located in the southern end of the park, houses exhibits of taxidermy, specializing in rare species of Burmese fauna with explanatory charts and captions. Many of the curators are postgraduate students of zoology from the University of Yangon.

Animal Performance Shows
Various animal shows are performed on weekends and public holidays during the fall and summer seasons (November to April).

Aquarium
Opened in 1998, the aquarium is the first large scale aquarium in the country.

Amusement Park
The amusement park has a number of rides including roller coaster.

References

Zoos in Myanmar
Buildings and structures in Yangon
1906 establishments in Burma
Zoos established in 1906